Chesebrough may refer to:

Robert Chesebrough (1837–1933), an American chemist
 Chesebrough Manufacturing Company, American oil business which produced petroleum jelly or vaseline
Chesebrough Scout Reservation, also called Camp Chesebrough

See also
 Cheeseborough (disambiguation)
 Cheesebrough (disambiguation)
 Cheseborough (disambiguation)
 Chesebro